The Tri-County Conference of Central Indiana was founded in 1935, as the county schools in Monroe, Morgan, and Owen counties joined together to stabilize their schedules. The conference wound up in 1971, as only three schools from Monroe County remained, and they would close three years later. Out of the four leagues bearing the TCC moniker that existed in Indiana, this has the distinction of being both the first and the last one remaining at the time of its demise.

Members

 Played concurrently in the JCC and TCC 1935-

References

Indiana high school athletic conferences
High school sports conferences and leagues in the United States